Hilton San Diego Bayfront is a hotel in San Diego, California. It has a height of 385 ft (117 m) and contains 1,190 rooms. Located in the Marina district of Downtown San Diego, Hilton San Diego Bayfront is 30-story, and utilizes the modern architectural style. It was designed by the firm John Portman & Associates. The skyscraper is located directly adjacent to the San Diego Convention Center, along the San Diego Bay. 

Hilton Worldwide fully owned and operated the hotel until 2011 when the company sold 75% of the building to Sunstone Hotels, and maintained 25% ownership at a cash value of $475 million. Hilton Worldwide still remains the sole corporate operator of the property.

History
On May 19, 2008 a natural gas leak caused an explosion that injured 14 construction workers and damaged four floors on the unfinished hotel.

Design
A skybridge connects the parking garage to a crosswalk that goes to Petco Park and the Gaslamp Quarter.

During the summer of 2019, the hotel completed a $23 million guest room and suite renovation inspired by maritime culture with modern ease.

See also
List of tallest buildings in San Diego
List of largest hotels in the world

References

External links 
Hilton San Diego Bayfront
Hilton San Diego Bayfront Hotel

2008 establishments in California
Skyscraper hotels in San Diego
Hotel buildings completed in 2008
John C. Portman Jr. buildings